Llay-Llay is a town and commune in the San Felipe de Aconcagua Province of central Chile's Valparaíso Region.

History
The commune was established on 6 April 1875 during the government of President Federico Errázuriz Zañartu, A railway station was initially built for the three copper smelters that existed there.

Llay-Llay made news on 14 September 1863, the date was celebrated with a grand banquet in the village to celebrate the official opening of the railway line between Santiago and Valparaiso, an act that was attended by the President of the Republic, Don José Joaquín Pérez. On 6 April 1875 by Supreme Decree it was granted the title of town.

In December 1925, the Commune of Llay-Llay was integrated into the Department of Quillota, divided into four districts. As of March 1976, according to the regional administration of the country, it joined the province of San Felipe de Aconcagua.

Geography

Demographics
According to data from the 2002 Census of Population and Housing, the Llay-Llay commune had 21,644 inhabitants; of these, 16,215 (74.9%) lived in urban areas and 5,429 (25.1%) in rural areas. At that time, there were 10,799 men and 10,845 women.

Administration
As a commune, Llay-Llay is a third-level administrative division of Chile, administered by a communal council (consejo comunal), which is headed by a directly elected alcalde. The current alcalde is Mario Marillanca. The communal council has the following members:
 Patricio Durán
 Margarita Puebla
 Marcos Flores
 Mésala González
 Oscar Hidalgo
 Manuel Maldonado

Within the electoral divisions of Chile, Llaillay is represented in the Chamber of Deputies by Marco Antonio Núñez (PDC) and Gaspar Rivas (RN) as part of the 11th electoral district, together with Los Andes, San Esteban, Calle Larga, Rinconada, San Felipe, Putaendo, Santa María, Panquehue and Catemu. The commune is represented in the Senate by Ignacio Walker Prieto (PDC) and Lily Pérez San Martín (RN) as part of the 5th senatorial constituency (Valparaíso-Cordillera).

References

External links
 Municipality of Llay-Llay

Populated places in San Felipe de Aconcagua Province
Communes of Chile
1875 establishments in Chile